Sorority Girl (also known as Sorority House or The Bad One) is a 1957 film noir exploitation film directed by Roger Corman.  It stars Susan Cabot as Sabra, a sociopath who plays a very disruptive role in a sorority, with Barboura Morris as Rita, and Dick Miller and June Kenney. It was released by American International Pictures as a double feature with Motorcycle Gang.

In England it was known as The Bad One. The film was remade in 1994 as Confessions of a Sorority Girl.

Plot
A spoiled rich girl named Sabra Tanner (who feels ignored by her rich mother) teases and harasses her college schoolmates even though she doesn't know why she wants to hurt all the people around her. Her sociopathic antics bring bad consequences for her when her actions drive one of her classmates to suicide. Realizing she is completely ostracized, Sabra walks into the ocean to drown herself.

Cast
 Susan Cabot as Sabra Tanner
 Dick Miller as Mort
 Barboura Morris (credited as Barboura O'Neill) as Rita Joyce
 June Kenney as Tina
 Fay Baker as Mrs. Tanner
 Barbara Cowan (credited as Barbara Crane) as Ellie Marshall
 Jeane Wood as Mrs. Fessenden, the housemother
 Margaret Campbell
 Beach Dickerson
 Jean Lora
 Jay Sayer

Production
 
Corman says that the script was developed by AIP. He did not like it and had some of it rewritten, although not as much as he liked.

Shooting started 15 July 1957 at Ziv Studios. Filming also took place at the mansion of Ruta Lee in Laurel Canyon.

Susan Cabot later recalled working on Corman films:
We would have some sort of a script, but there was a lot of, “Who’s going to say what?” and “How ’bout I do this?’ ’ — plenty of ad-libbing and improvising. But Roger was really great in a way; he was very loose. If something didn’t work out, he changed it right away. He gave me a great amount of freedom , and also a chance to play parts that Universal 
would never have given me — oddball, wacko parts, like the very disturbed girl in Sorority Girl. I had a chance to do moments and scenes that I didn’t get before. 
Corman says while filming he made Cabot do an emotional scene in medium shot first, then when it was time to do a close up, Cabot's performance was not as strong. Corman says this prompted him to learn more about acting, so he enrolled in acting classes given by Jeff Corey, where he would meet people like Jack Nicholson and Robert Towne.

Release
The film was issued on a double bill with Motorcycle Gang.

The CSM said it had a "sad hodgepodge of a story".

See also
 List of American films of 1957

References

External links

Review from hotspotonline.com

1957 films
1950s teen drama films
American teen drama films
American black-and-white films
1950s English-language films
1950s exploitation films
Films directed by Roger Corman
Films about fraternities and sororities
American International Pictures films
Films produced by Roger Corman
Films scored by Ronald Stein
1957 drama films
1950s American films